Sandavágur is a city on the south coast of the Faroese island of Vágar.
The name Sandavágur means sandy bay and refers to the sandy beach which used to be much larger than present. From one point in Sandavágur you can get a view of all the southern islands in the Faroes. Sandavágur used to be a municipality until 1 January 2009, when it fused together with the neighbour village Miðvágur into the new Vágar municipality.

Data:

History

The town has an ancient history. A 13th century runestone, discovered in 1917, bears an inscription stating that the Norwegian Viking Torkil Onundarson from Rogaland was the first settler in this area. The stone can be seen in Sandavágur Church. Excavations in the town have also uncovered ruins from the Middle Ages.

Á Steig in Sandavágur was the residence of the Lagman, the lawspeaker and leader of the Faroese parliament, until 1816, when the office was abolished and the islands became a Danish administrative district. The clergyman V. U. Hammershaimb, who was born in Sandavágur in 1819 and became the father of the Faroese written language, was the son of the last law speaker.

There is a freestanding rock to the east of the town called Trøllkonufingur, which means Witch’s finger. It is said to have been climbed only once, and the story goes like this:
"Frederick VII of Denmark visited the Faroe Islands in 1844, and a man climbed the Witch’s finger so that he could wave to the King as he sailed past. Later, when the man had come down, he realized that he had left one of his gloves on the top of the rock, so decided to climb it again. On his way to the top he fell and died."

Buildings
The distinctive red-roofed Church was built in 1917. A memorial was erected outside the church to one of the many ships that were sunk during the Second World War.

Vestanstevna festival
Sandavagur takes turns in hosting a civic festival called Vestanstevna which takes place annually at the beginning of July. The other participating villages are, Miðvágur and Sørvágur. The festival is similar to Olavsøka in Tórshavn but smaller.

Economy
Kovin, the canning factory in Sandavágur produces canned fish products: primarily shrimp, but also roe and normal fish meat. It also produces various kinds of pâté, for example from salmon, shrimps and tuna.

Sports
The local football team was SÍF Sandavágur until they merged with MB Miðvágur to form FS Vágar in 1993. The merger collapsed in 2004 and the clubs separated again only for SÍF to become part of a newly formed club, 07 Vestur.

The scorer of the only goal in the Faroe Islands national football teams first ever competitive match, a shock win over Austria in 1990, Torkil Nielsen, was born in Sandavágur.

Notable people
 V. U. Hammershaimb (1819–1909) - founder of the Faroese written language.
 Torkil Nielsen, scorer of the first goal ever of the Faroe Islands national football team
 Samuel Jacob Sesanus Olsen (1904–1994) - teacher, writer and translator.

Gallery

See also

 List of towns in the Faroe Islands
 Vágar

References

External links

 Official website of Vága kommuna

Populated places in the Faroe Islands
Vágar